Hay River/Merlyn Carter Airport  is located  north of Hay River, Northwest Territories, Canada.

The airport is named for former bush pilot Merlyn Carter, who was killed by a black bear in 2005.

Sandhill cranes may be found nesting on the airport from May until September.

Airlines and destinations

Cargo

See also
 Hay River Water Aerodrome
 Hay River/Brabant Lodge Water Aerodrome

References

External links

Certified airports in the South Slave Region